The Stewart M-1 Monoplane was the first of two aircraft designed and built by the W.F. Stewart Company, as their usual work of building custom wooden auto bodies was falling out of favor at that time.

Design
The M-1 was a conventional landing gear equipped, all-wooden construction, mid-winged monoplane with two tandem open cockpits, each of which had side-by-side seating for a total of four people. It was powered by a  Curtiss OX-5 engine. The wing spar was made of spruce with mahogany veneer.

Operational history
The prototype was test flown from 1928 to 1929. Production was canceled with the onset of the Great Depression. One owner operated the aircraft from Flint, Michigan until 1934. The prototype was dismantled in 1937.

Specifications (Stewart M-1)

References

W.F. Stewart Company aircraft
Mid-wing aircraft
Aircraft first flown in 1927
Single-engined tractor aircraft